Because I Love It is the third studio album by American singer Amerie. It was released on May 11, 2007, by Columbia Records. In the United States, the album was released exclusively through retailers such as Walmart and FYE, before its physical release was officially made available on September 30, 2008, by which point all future singles and promotion had been scrapped due to Amerie's departure from Columbia Records. As a result, the album failed to chart on the Billboard 200, becoming Amerie's first studio album to do so. Nevertheless, the album was a moderate success in Europe and Japan, and has been certified silver by the British Pornographic Industry (BPI).

Background
The recording sessions for Because I Love It started in 2005. It was originally titled None of the Above and scheduled for late 2006; however, plans were changed. The album was finished in early 2007. Amerie's first mixtape Because I Love It, Vol. 1 was also released. However, the album was not released in the United States until 2008, and Amerie was dropped from Columbia Records and Sony Urban Music due to low sales of Because I Love It and the low performance of its singles "Take Control", "Gotta Work" and "That's What U R".

Because I Love It is primarily an R&B album, also comprising funk, soul and hip hop. Tracks like "Some Like It" and "Crazy Wonderful" also contain elements from 1980s music. The album was executively produced by Amerie and her husband-manager Lenny Nicholson and produced by Bryan-Michael Cox, The Buchanans, Cee-Lo Green, Quran Goodman, Destro, One Up, Chris & Drop, Mike Caren, Curtis "C Note" Richardson, Bink!, and Kore & Bellek. Amerie's longtime producer Rich Harrison did not work on the album, although "1 Thing", which he produced, appears as a bonus track on the international edition.

Because I Love It was the final album by Amerie to be released through Columbia Records, also her first not to be released through Harrison's recording label Richcraft Records. It was also Amerie's final album to be released through Sony BMG Music Entertainment and Sony Music Entertainment before Amerie signed a recording contract with Universal Music Group's Def Jam Recordings and Island Records in 2008.

Release and promotion
Because I Love It was released for the UK iTunes Store on May 11, 2007, through Columbia Records. It was released physically on May 14, 2007, in the United Kingdom. It was released in Japan two days later and in Europe on May 28. In the United States, the album was released on CD through Walmart on July 3, 2007, and though FYE on January 15, 2008; it was not given a wider physical release until September 30, 2008, though Amerie was no longer signed to Columbia at that point. Because of this, album was not promoted in United States. Worldwide, Because I Love It was promoted by three singles: "Take Control", "Gotta Work" and "That's What U R".

Singles
"Take Control" was released as the lead single from the album on October 17, 2006. Its accompanying music video debuted in the United States in December 2006. The song peaked at number 66 on the US Billboard Hot R&B/Hip-Hop Songs chart, but was considerably more successful overseas, reaching number 10 in the United Kingdom. The official remix featured South Korean singer Seven and was featured as a bonus track on the East Asian edition of the album.

"Gotta Work" was released as the album's second single outside the United States on April 14, 2007. It was used to help promote TNT's coverage of the 2008 NBA All-Star Game in the United States, and AXN Television in Asia. The single peaked at number 21 on the UK Singles Chart and number six on the UK R&B Singles Chart.

"Crush" was scheduled as the third single, but its release was cancelled. A remix of "Crush" produced by Johnny Douglas was intended to be used for the radio version of the single. Instead, "That's What U R" was released as the album's third and final single for a limited promotional-only basis on October 23, 2007. The radio version was a remix featuring rap verses by Fabolous and Slim Thug. The version can be found on some Asian limited editions of Because I Love It.

Critical reception

Because I Love It received wide acclaim from various music critics. AllHipHop.com praised the album giving it five out of five stars, stating that Amerie has the "ability to convey excitement without sounding insane" but pointing out that "doesn't fit neatly into any specific genre anyway, so she might as well leave the standard R&B fare to the army of standard R&B chicks available to sing them." AllMusic also praised the album, stating that the album "lassoe[d] each song, whether it require[d] salt, sugar, heartache, delight, or any combination thereof" and further noting that "[s]he is the only female singer on the album, and hearing her backgrounds dance and swim around her leads is as moving as anything else in modern R&B". Despite mixed criticism towards its ballads, Spin praised the album's sound and called it "R&B at its most dynamic". The Observer gave it a favorable review, writing "It's no classic, but the obligatory ballads are mercifully few, allowing a series of punchy, soulpowered tracks to shine".

The Guardian lauded Amerie as "one of the greatest singers in pop music" and wrote that Because I Love It was a "spectacular work" because she "catches the fleeting thrills and momentary rushes of intensity that permeate otherwise mundane days, and stretches those feelings out across four-minute songs without ever letting up." NME  described the album as "bar-raising pop" and called it a "whip-smart collection of retro R&B that's more Winehouse than Aguilera". Tim Finney of Pitchfork noted that the album's "big, risky strategic manoeuvre is a plush, post-coital riposte to Ciara's recent electro-pop revivalism, with many of the songs here investing in a deliberately frothy eighties sound that smears together Prince, Jam & Lewis, and the SOS Band", adding that "[t]he danger for [Amerie] is that in trying so hard to clinch this new style she leaves little room to assert her own individual qualities". Lou Thomas from BBC Music called the album "a mix of the sweat-drenched sublime and the saccharine ridiculous", while commenting that "[t]here's still a flavour of the percussive, filthy Washington DC Go-go sound that gives her music a satisfying and unique feel within the pop world, but at other times the sugar content will repulse all but those with the sweetest tune tooth. And songwriter She McElroy's suggestion to add old school Weekend Love was genius."

Commercial performance
Because I Love It was a moderate success but failed to repeat the success of previous studio albums All I Have (2002) and Touch (2005). It failed to chart in both the United States and Canada, since it was not released in those countries until September 30, 2008 (more than a year after it was released worldwide). It only charted on some European charts (including Billboards European Top 100 Albums chart, where it peaked at number 56) and Japanese Oricon chart, where it peaked at number 13. The album peaked at number 17 on UK Albums Chart and number four on UK R&B Albums Chart. It has sold over 60,000 copies in United Kingdom and has been certified silver by British Phonographic Industry (BPI).

Track listing

Notes
  signifies a vocal producer
  signifies a co-producer
  signifies an additional producer
  signifies a main and vocal producer

Sample credits
 "Forecast Intro" contains samples from "Farandole" by Bob James.
 "Hate 2 Love U" contains samples from "Give It Up" by Kool & the Gang.
 "Some Like It" contains samples from "World's Famous" by Malcolm McLaren.
 "Take Control" contains excerpts from "Jimmy, Renda-se" by Tom Zé and elements of "You Make My Dreams" by Hall & Oates.
 "Gotta Work" contains samples from "Hold On I'm Coming" by Mighty Dog Haynes.
 "Paint Me Over" contains samples from "Mother's Theme (Mama)" by Willie Hutch.
 "All Roads" contains samples from "How Do You Keep the Music Playing?" by James Ingram and Patti Austin.
 "1 Thing" contains excerpts from "Oh, Calcutta!" by the Meters.
 "Losing U" contains a sample from "Didi" by Khaled.

Charts

Certifications

Release history

References

External links
 Dancefloor Dynamite at The Guardian

2007 albums
Albums produced by Bink (record producer)
Amerie albums
Columbia Records albums